Rinus Ferdinandusse (28 November 1931 – 23 July 2022) was a Dutch writer and journalist.

References

1931 births
2022 deaths
Dutch writers
Dutch journalists
People from Goes